Madole is a surname. Notable people with the surname include:

Howard Madole (1923–2015), American architect
James H. Madole (1927–1979), American fascist